The following is a list of episodes for the British children's television series Sarah & Duck, that began airing on CBeebies from 18 February 2013.

Series overview

{|class="wikitable" style="width:33%;"
|-
!style="padding:0 8px;" rowspan="2" colspan="2"|Series
!style="padding:0 8px;" rowspan="2"|Episodes
!style="padding:0 8px;" colspan="2"|Originally aired
|-
!First aired
!Last aired
|-
|style="background:#F2F2F2; height:10px;"|
|style="text-align:center;"|[[List of Sarah & Duck episodes#Series 1 (2013)|1]]
|style="text-align:center;"|40
|style="text-align:center;"|
|style="text-align:center;"|
|-
|width="15px" bgcolor="F2F2F2" |
|style="text-align:center;"|[[List of Sarah & Duck episodes#Series 2 (2014–15)|2]]
|style="text-align:center;"|40
|style="text-align:center;"|
|style="text-align:center;"|
|-
|width="15px" bgcolor="F2F2F2" |
|style="text-align:center;"|[[List of Sarah & Duck episodes#Series 3 (2016–17)|3]]
|style="text-align:center;"|40
|style="text-align:center;"|
|style="text-align:center;"|
|}

Episodes

Series 1 (2013)

Series 2 (2014–15)

Series 3 (2016–17)

Notes

References

Lists of British animated television series episodes
Lists of British children's television series episodes